Serón is a municipality of Almería province, in the autonomous community of Andalusia, Spain.

Demographics

References

External links
  Serón - Sistema de Información Multiterritorial de Andalucía
  Serón - Diputación Provincial de Almería
  Serón Information - General Information about Serón

Municipalities in the Province of Almería